Tahajjud Cinta is the sixteenth album by Dato' Siti Nurhaliza and also her first album to be categorised as a spiritual or religious album. The album was released on 9 September 2009, during the holy month of Ramadan to celebrate the lack of albums in the market that propose the holistic genre. This is the first album to be released by Siti Nurhaliza in her father's absence.

Background
The album was composed of eight songs. Two songs, Ketika Cinta and Pintu Rindu, were cover versions. The first was a covered version of a single by an Indonesian religious singer, Opick, whereas the latter was originally in Arabic before it was recorded into Bahasa Malaysia.
The song Ketika Cinta was also used in an Indonesian film Perempuan Berkalung Sorban, together with the song Batas Asaku. At the bridge of this song, Siti Nurhaliza using her falsetto ranged at E6, the highest notes of head tone she had done. The album was dedicated in memory of Siti's father, Tarudin Ismail who died in 15 February 2009, seven months before the album's release.

Track listing
The album was created by famous Malaysian and Indonesian composers and writers like Habsah Hassan, Audi Mok and others to suit the spiritual genre.

References

External links
 Tahajjud Cinta by Siti Nurhaliza at iTunes Malaysia

2009 albums
Siti Nurhaliza albums
Albums produced by Siti Nurhaliza
Malay-language albums